Vũ Thư is a rural district of Thái Bình province in the Red River Delta region of Vietnam. As of 2003 the district had a population of 229,406. The district covers an area of 199 km². The district capital lies at Vũ Thư.

References

Districts of Thái Bình province